The Fascism and Freedom Movement – National Socialist Party (MFL–PSN), called simply Fascism and Freedom Movement, is an Italian fascist political party. It was formed on 25 July 1991 by senator Giorgio Pisanò.

History

Fascism and Freedom Movement was founded in 1989 as a political movement inside the Italian Social Movement, centered around Senator Giorgio Pisanò and his weekly Candido. Finally, it separated from the MSI on 25 July 1991.
In 2009, it added the words National Socialist Party (NSP) to its original name. The movement has been sued several times for alleged reconstitution of the dissolved National Fascist Party. It refuses agreements and / or alliances with other neo-fascist parties, stressing categorically not to be classified as a right-wing party, and that similar parties do not sufficiently adhere to Fascist ideology. The party makes explicit reference to the ideals of the Italian Social Republic as corporatism and the nationalization of the economy. Their ideology is based on the thought of fascist leader Benito Mussolini, and has as its main objective the realization of Mussolini's strongly hierarchical corporate democracy based on social credit. The party is also in favor of a presidential republic, and expresses a strong sense of anti-Americanism and anti-Zionism.

It is the only recognised party in Italy with the inscription "Fascismo" on its logo. Overall, it is an ultranationalist party with tendencies towards the Third Position and anti-capitalism.

Congresses 
 I National Congress - Prato, 1 March 1998
 II National Congress - Trieste, 10 October 1999
 III National Congress - Torino, 2 December 2001
 IV National Congress - Torino, 29 October 2006
 V National Congress - Villanova d'Asti, 6 November 2011

Secretaries of the MFL

References

1991 establishments in Italy
Anti-Zionist political parties
Nationalist parties in Italy
Neo-fascist organisations in Italy
Neo-fascist parties
Third Position
Political parties established in 1991
Social credit parties